Scott Walker may refer to:
Scott Walker (singer) (1943–2019), American solo singer and member of The Walker Brothers
Scott Walker: 30 Century Man, a 2006 documentary about the singer
Scott Walker (politician) (born 1967), American politician; 45th Governor of Wisconsin
Scott Walker (judge) (born 1953), American judge
Scott Walker (boxer) (1969–2004), American professional boxer
Scott Walker (bobsleigh) (born 1970), Australian bobsledder
Scott Walker (ice hockey) (born 1973), Canadian professional ice hockey player and head coach of the Guelph Storm
Scott Walker (footballer) (born 1975), Scottish footballer, played for St. Mirren, Dunfermline Athletic and Hartlepool United
Scott Walker, convicted of the murder of Jody Dobrowski in South London in 2005
Scott Walker (director), New Zealand director of The Frozen Ground
Scott Walker, Republican Party nominee for the 2018 United States House of Representatives election in Delaware

See also
Scott Tallon Walker, an Irish architecture firm founded by Michael Scott, Ronnie Tallon and Robin Walker
Walker Scott, a department store chain in Southern California, United States